Baie des Flamand is a bay located on the southern side of the Sud department of Haiti. It is a branch of the larger Baie des Cayes and the Caribbean Sea.

References

Bodies of water of Haiti